This is a list of episodes of all three entries of Garo: The Animation, a collective of anime spin-off from 2005's Garo tokusatsu drama. From Episodes 50-62, the opening theme "EMG" is performed by JAM Project, while the ending theme "Sophia" is performed by Masami Okui. From Episode 63-74, the opening theme is "Howling Sword" by Shuhei Kita, and the ending theme is "Promise" by Chihiro Yonekura. Funimation has licensed the series in North America.

Episode list

Garo: The Carved Seal of Flames

Garo: Crimson Moon

Garo: Vanishing Line

Notes

References

External links

The Animation episodes
Garo